Norman Alexander McLarty,  (February 18, 1889 – September 6, 1945) was a Canadian politician.

Born in St. Thomas, Ontario, he was first elected to the House of Commons of Canada representing the riding of Essex West in the 1935 federal election.

A Liberal, he was re-elected in 1940. He was the Postmaster General, Minister of Labour, and Secretary of State of Canada in the cabinet of Mackenzie King. He served as acting president of the National Liberal Federation in 1943.

References

1889 births
1945 deaths
Liberal Party of Canada MPs
Members of the House of Commons of Canada from Ontario
Members of the King's Privy Council for Canada
People from St. Thomas, Ontario